The Embassy of Bolivia in London is the diplomatic mission of Bolivia in the United Kingdom. It is located on Eaton Square in the Belgravia district.

References

External links
Official site

Bolivia
Diplomatic missions of Bolivia
Bolivia–United Kingdom relations
Buildings and structures in the City of Westminster
Belgravia